TRT World is a Turkish public broadcaster which broadcasts in English 24 hours a day and is operated by the TRT and based in the Ulus area of Istanbul. It provides worldwide news and current affairs focusing on Turkey, Europe, Africa, and Western and Southern Asia. In addition to its Istanbul headquarters, TRT World has broadcasting centres and studios in Washington D.C. and London. It is a member of the Association for International Broadcasting.

The network has received criticism for failing to meet accepted journalism ethics and standards for independence and objectivity, with some commentators especially in the West calling it a mouthpiece or propaganda arm of the Erdoğan administration. TRT World has stated that it is financially and editorially independent from the administration, and that its news gathering and reporting activities are just like those of other publicly-funded broadcasters around the world, with a mission to show a non-Turkish audience events from Turkey's viewpoint. However, according to Reporters Without Borders, Turkey in 2020 ranked 154th out of 179 countries in press freedom.

Programmes 

In addition to those listed below, TRT World runs various once-off documentaries. Current programmes on the channel are:
 Africa Matters: Africa Matters, hosted by Adesewa Josh, is TRT World’s flagship Africa programme that brings stories from the African continent.
 Across The Balkans: Weekly programme hosted by Nafisa Latic, prepared by Zeynep Gizem Ozdemir, featuring interviews with guests from Balkan Region regarding issues related to the region.
 Beyond the game: Daily sports show
 Money Talks: Daily finance programme hosted by Azhar Sukri, featuring TRT World's Editor at Large, Craig Copetas with in-depth reports and analysis,
 Roundtable: Hosted by David Foster. Roundtable is a discussion programme where guests debate the news.
 Showcase: Daily arts and culture show.
 The Newsmakers: The channel's flagship current affairs programme, featuring reports and interviews.
 Compass: Monthly documentary series filmed globally. Compass is an exploration of issues through art, culture and creativity.
 Double-Check: Weekly show double-checking various news stories from the week. Turkish-Australian journalist Omer Kablan is the presenter and writer for the show.
 Inside America with Ghida Fakhry: Weekly in-depth interviews with American opinion and policy-makers exploring the issues shaping US politics, presented by Ghida Fakhry.
 Bigger Than Five: Current affairs program about global issues and international power politics hosted by Ghida Fakhry. Its name derived from Recep Tayyip Erdoğan's saying "The world is bigger than five".
 Decoded
 Strait Talk: Brings audience the much-needed context to stories that are changing the world. It features in depth analyses of global events that are redefining our age. This show is hosted by Ayse Suberker.

Notable staff 

 Ghida Fakhry
 Shiulie Ghosh
 Adnan Nawaz
 Martin Sandford
 Andrea Sanke
 Kate Partridge
 Maria Ramos
 Michelle Kosinski
 Rachel Ruble
 Efnan Han
 Andrew Hopkins
 Adesewa Josh
 Rahul Radhakrishnan

Awards and nominations 

In 2018 TRT World was nominated in 5 categories at the Drum Online Media Awards:

 Social Media Team of the year
 Technology Leader of the year
 Breaking News Story of the year
 App of the year
 Technical Innovation of the year

Press freedom and neutrality 

In March 2020, the United States Justice Department required TRT World's Washington operation to register as an agent of the Government of Turkey, engaged in political activities, under the anti-propaganda Foreign Agents Registration Act. TRT World's argument that it is independent was rejected by US officials who found and claim that the Turkish government "exercises direction and control of TRT by regulation and oversight, and by controlling its leadership, budget, and content." Apart from some Russian and Chinese networks, other state-funded media including the Qatari-backed Al Jazeera, British-backed BBC News, French-backed France 24 and German-backed Deutsche Welle had not been determined to be foreign-government agents.

In a 2019 op-ed in The Washington Post, MEMRI's executive director Steven Stalinsky surmised TRT World as "a propaganda arm of Turkish President Recep Tayyip Erdogan's regime", similar to the Russian RT network. He notes that the channel offered only enthusiastically promotional coverage of the Turkish military's Operation Peace Spring in Syria, while according to the Committee to Protect Journalists, the government banned critical news coverage domestically. Stalinsky urges human rights activists, journalists, and others not to appear on and legitimise the network's shows, just as they would not appear on RT.

Following the 2016 Turkish coup attempt, some journalists who had recently joined the company resigned. One of those who resigned said: "I no longer hold out any hope that this channel will become what I wanted it to become (...) After the coup, it became very apparent that the channel had no intention of actually covering it properly, in a professional, international broadcast standard." The managing editor at the time said that he "never received a phone call from Ankara trying to frame the broadcast or give them talking points."

More recently as of March 2020 with the Evros border crisis, TRT World and other Turkish media have in a way, accelerated on producing fake news as alleged by the Greek government, as was also mentioned by Prime Minister of Greece Kyriakos Mitsotakis in a CNN interview twice, stating that the reports all come from Turkish media and other unknown sources aiming to discredit the Hellenic Coast Guard and Hellenic Armed Forces efforts with propaganda videos. TRT World claimed that Greece sent back refugee vessels to Turkish waters, which was denied by Greece. Conversely, there have been reports by other sources of Greek coastal authorities forcing the refugee vessels back to Turkish side, in a military strategy dubbed "push back".

See also 
 TRT Haber

References

External links 
 

Turkish Radio and Television Corporation
Publicly funded broadcasters
European Broadcasting Union members
Turkish news websites
24-hour television news channels in Turkey
State media
Multilingual news services
International broadcasters
Television channels and stations established in 2015
Television channels in North Macedonia